Erumely Sree Dharmasastha Temple is a traditional Hindu temple located in Erumely town in Kottayam district in the  Indian state of Kerala. The temple is dedicated to Lord Ayyappa or Dharmasastha. It is also an important meeting place of Sabarimala pilgrims.

Temple 
There are two temples in Erumely town. This temple is known as Valiyambalam and the other one is Kochambalam. Both the temples are situated within . The famous Erumely Pettathullal during Sabarimala pilgrimage is performed near the Valiyambalam and Kochambalam. The Erumely 'Vavar masjid' is also located near to the temple. Pilgrims have the necessary facilities like accommodation, food and water at this temple, provided by Travancore Devaswom Board. 'Tazhmon Mutt' holds the tantric rights of the temple.

Festival 
Annual festival (utsavam) is hosted in the month of February (Kumbham) for 10 days and celebrated grandly.

Gallery

References

Hindu temples in Kottayam district